Tennis at the 2019 South Asian Games was hosted at the International Sports Complex, Satdobato, in Lalitpur, Nepal from 2 to 10 December 2019.

Medal table

Medalists

References

2019 South Asian Games
Events at the 2019 South Asian Games
Tennis at the South Asian Games